Joshua Vanneck, 2nd Baron Huntingfield (12 August 1778 – 10 August 1844) of Heveningham Hall in Suffolk, was a British peer and Member of Parliament (MP).

Huntingfield was the son of Joshua Vanneck, 1st Baron Huntingfield, and Maria Thompson. His paternal grandfather Sir Joshua Vanneck, 1st Baronet, had emigrated from the Netherlands in 1722 and had become a prominent London merchant. In 1816 Huntingfield succeeded his father both as second Baron Huntingfield and as Tory Member of Parliament for Dunwich, a seat he held until 1819. The barony of Huntingfield was an Irish peerage and did not entitle him to a seat in the House of Lords.

Lord Huntingfield married, firstly, Frances Catherine Arcedeckne, daughter of Chalenor Arcedeckne, in 1810. She died in 1815 and in 1817 he married, secondly, Lucy Anne Blois, daughter of Sir Charles Blois, 6th Baronet. He died in August 1844, aged 65, and was succeeded in his titles and estates by his son from his second marriage, Charles. Lady Huntingfield died in 1889.

References

Kidd, Charles, Williamson, David (editors). Debrett's Peerage and Baronetage (1990 edition). New York: St Martin's Press, 1990,

External links 
 

1778 births
1844 deaths
Barons in the Peerage of Ireland
Tory MPs (pre-1834)
Members of the Parliament of the United Kingdom for English constituencies
UK MPs 1812–1818
UK MPs 1818–1820
UK MPs who inherited peerages
Joshua